Thomas Robert Burman (born November 28, 1940) is an American make-up artist. He was nominated for an Academy Award in the category Best Makeup and Hairstyling for the film Scrooged. Burman also won five Primetime Emmy Awards and was nominated for nine more in the category Outstanding Makeup.

Selected filmography 
 Scrooged (1988; co-nominated with Bari Dreiband-Burman)

References

External links 

1940 births
Living people
People from Los Angeles
American make-up artists
Primetime Emmy Award winners